Elections for the United States House of Representatives are preceded by primary elections, in which the party's nominee for each congressional district is chosen by popular vote. Incumbent representatives often win renomination, although there are some instances of incumbents who lose to a primary challenge. In cases of redistricting, incumbents may run against each other in the same district.

1972

1974

1976

1978

1980

1982

1984

1986

1988

1990

1992

1994

1996

1998

2000

2002

2004

2006

2008

2010

2012

2014

2016

2018

2020

2022

See also
 List of members of the United States House of Representatives who served a single term

References

Lists of members of the United States House of Representatives